The Contractions is an early-Eighties all-female punk power trio based in San Francisco.  The band consisted of Mary Kelley on guitar and vocals, Debbie Hopkins on drums and vocals, and Kathy Peck on bass and vocals. A review in BAM magazine calls the band "The hottest all woman group ever to come out of the Bay Area."

According to the group's own website: "The Contractions burned across the national Punk/New Wave scene from 1979 through 1985. Their rough-edged music mixed an urban garage-rock sound with a pop/new wave sensibility and grabbed immediate fan and critical support. One moment they were playing straight-ahead rock’n’roll, a classic power-trio — Debbie a veteran drummer with jazz sensibilities; Kathy on her Hofner playing a melodic bass-line; Mary with her Pete Townshend-windmill guitar strumming. Then, just when you thought you knew what you were listening to, the band would become James Joyce and Link Wray all wrapped into one, with Mary singing poetry over slow, mesmerizing, watery guitar, then tearing into a guitar solo worthy of Eric Clapton."

Bassist Kathy Peck is Co-Founder and Executive Director of H.E.A.R. (Hearing Education and Awareness for Rockers).

Kim Morris joined the band in 1982 as keyboard player, singer and songwriter, but left for personal reasons after one short year.

External links

 The Contractions Official website
 Music Life Radio Interview with Kathy Peck - June 2012

All-female punk bands